Rya or RYA may refer to:

Biology
 Rya sheep, breed of sheep native to Sweden
 Rya, a genus in subfamily Blennocampinae

People
 Rya Kihlstedt (born 1970), American actress
 Rya W. Zobel (born 1931), judge of the United States District Court for the District of Massachusetts

Places
 Rya, Sweden
 Rya Forest, Sweden
 Rya Formation, Sweden
 Rya Tunnel, a subsea road tunnel in Tromsø Municipality, Troms og Finnmark, Norway

Other uses
 Rya (rug), type of woolen rug
 Royal Yachting Association, a United Kingdom national body for sailing
 Ryijy ('rya' in Swedish),a woven Finnish long-tufted tapestry or knotted-pile carpet hanging